Deidre is a feminine given name and variant of the given name Deirdre, derived from Deirdre, a tragic heroine in Irish mythology. 
Notable people with the name include:

 Deidre Airey (1926–2002), ceramic artist from New Zealand
 Deidre Downs (born 1980), Miss America 2005
 Deidre Hall (born 1947), American actress
 Deidre Henderson (born 1974), American politician
 Deidre Holland (born 1966), Dutch porn star
 Deidre McCalla (21st century), American singer-songwriter
 Deidre Rubenstein (born 1948), Australian television and theatre actress
 Deidre Sanders (born 1945), British agony aunt and writer of the Dear Deidre column in The Sun

See also 
 List of Irish-language given names
 Deirdre (disambiguation)

Feminine given names
Irish-language feminine given names